Kešeljević and Kešelj (Кешељ) are two Serbian surnames worn by families which have common origin. The Kešeljevići and Andrijaševići in Grahovo, Nikšić are branches of the Mandić brotherhood of Drobnjaci. The Kešeljević hail from Kešeljeva Gradina in Grahovo. Kešeljević families exist in Herzegovina and Bosnia (1930). The surname was also found in Kosovo and Metohija. Stanko Kešeljević left for Visoko in Bosnia in the mid-18th century. The Kešeljević family in Visoko died out on the male line. In Rakovica, the Orthodox families of Tolj, Milić and Kešelj are the oldest families in the settlement. Several Kešeljević were among the first Montenegrins in America.

Notable people
Kešeljević
Aleksandar Kešeljević, Slovenian economist
Jelena Kešeljević, Yugoslav actress
Vlada Kešeljević, actor
Đorđe Kešeljević, World War II commander of the 83rd Fighter Aviation Regiment
Nikola Kešeljević (1890–), academic, born in Grahovo

Kešelj
Marko Kešelj, Serbian basketball player
Mitar Kešelj, vojvoda of Nevesinje (1875–1878)
Rade Kešelj, barjaktar (1875–1878)
Miloš Kešelj, Herzegovinian rebel emissary (1875–1878)

References

Serbian surnames